is a Japanese football player for Ventforet Kofu.

Club career statistics
Updated to 23 February 2018.

References

External links
Profile at Ventforet Kofu

 

1990 births
Living people
Yamanashi Gakuin University alumni
Association football people from Nagano Prefecture
Japanese footballers
J1 League players
J2 League players
Ventforet Kofu players
Association football defenders